West Texas is a loosely defined region in the U.S. state of Texas, generally encompassing the arid and semiarid lands west of a line drawn between the cities of Wichita Falls, Abilene, and Del Rio.

No consensus exists on the boundary between East Texas and West Texas. While most Texans understand these terms, no  boundaries are officially recognized and any two individuals are likely to describe the boundaries of these regions differently. Walter Prescott Webb,  American historian and geographer, suggested that the 98th meridian separates East and West Texas; Texas writer A.C. Greene proposed that West Texas extends west of the Brazos River.  Use of a single line, though, seems to preclude the use of other separators, such as an area—Central Texas. Unlike East Texas, West Texas is not generally considered to be part of the American South, and the dry, desert climate is often more associated with the American Southwest.

West Texas is often subdivided according to distinct physiographic features. The portion of West Texas that lies west of the Pecos River is often referred to as "Far West Texas" or the "Trans-Pecos", a term first introduced in 1887 by Texas geologist Robert T. Hill. The Trans-Pecos lies within the Chihuahuan Desert, and is the most arid portion of the state.  Another part of West Texas is the Llano Estacado, a vast region of high, level plains extending into Eastern New Mexico and the Texas Panhandle. To the east of the Llano Estacado lies the “redbed country” of the Rolling Plains and to the south of the Llano Estacado lies the Edwards Plateau. The Rolling Plains and the Edwards Plateau subregions act as transitional zones between eastern and western Texas.

Climate
West Texas receives much less rainfall than the rest of Texas and has an arid or semiarid climate, requiring most of its scant agriculture to be heavily dependent on irrigation. This irrigation, and water taken out farther north for the needs of El Paso and Juarez, Mexico, has reduced the once mighty Rio Grande to a stream in some places, even dry at times. Much of West Texas has rugged terrain, including many small mountain ranges, while most parts of the state are near sea level. The northern parts of West Texas (notably the Texas Panhandle) and the higher elevations of the mountain ranges of the Trans-Pecos region are prone to occasional heavy snowfall during winter, while snow is less common in other areas of West Texas.

Counties
The counties included in the West Texas region vary depending on the organization. The Texas Counties.net website acknowledges the variations, and includes 70 counties in its definition, based on the five principal metropolitan areas it contains: El Paso, Lubbock, Abilene, Midland/Odessa, and San Angelo.

The counties included are Andrews, Bailey, Borden, Brewster, Brown, Callahan, Castro, Cochran, Coke, Coleman, Comanche, Concho, Crane, Crockett, Crosby, Culberson, Dawson, Deaf Smith, Dickens, Eastland, Ector, El Paso, Fisher, Floyd, Gaines, Garza, Glasscock, Hale, Haskell, Hockley, Howard, Hudspeth, Irion, Jeff Davis, Jones, Kent, Kimble, King, Knox, Lamb, Loving, Lubbock, Lynn, Martin, Mason, McCulloch, Menard, Midland, Mitchell, Motley, Nolan, Parmer, Potter, Pecos, Presidio, Randall, Reagan, Reeves, Runnels, Schleicher, Scurry, Shackelford, Stephens, Sterling, Stonewall, Sutton, Taylor, Terrell, Terry, Throckmorton, Tom Green, Upton, Ward, Winkler, and Yoakum.

Major cities

Some of the smaller West Texas cities and towns include: Alpine, Andrews, Anthony, Brownfield, Canutillo, Canyon, Coyanosa, Crane, Dalhart, Fort Davis, Fabens, Fort Bliss, San Elizario, Fort Stockton, Hale Center, Hereford, Iraan, Kermit, Lamesa, Levelland, Littlefield, Marathon, Marfa, McCamey, Mertzon, Monahans, Muleshoe, Ozona, Pampa, Pecos, Horizon City, Post, Rankin, Seminole, Slaton, Snyder, Sweetwater, and Van Horn.

Economy
Major industries include livestock, petroleum and natural gas production, textiles such as cotton, grain, and because of very large military installations such as Fort Bliss, the defense industry. West Texas has become notable for its numerous wind turbines producing clean and alternative electricity.

As of 2018, the West Texan economy was in a prosperous economic period, which has been described as the "West Texas oil boom".

Sports
West Texas does not have major league sports teams. Instead, the region has college teams such as Texas Tech Red Raiders, UTEP Miners, and Abilene Christian University Wildcats, which play in NCAA Division I, and NCAA Division II teams of the West Texas A&M Buffaloes, the Texas–Permian Basin Falcons, and the Lubbock Christian Chaparrals and Lady Chaps. El Paso also hosts the El Paso Chihuahuas, a AAA baseball team, and  El Paso Locomotive FC which plays in the USL Championship, the second tier of the American soccer pyramid. The Midland RockHounds and Amarillo Sod Poodles represent the region in double-A baseball. In 2019, the West Texas Rumbleweeds of the U.S. Arena Professional Soccer League began play. Junior hockey is also present in the region, with the Odessa Jackalopes of the Tier II North American Hockey League.

Politics
Except for the Trans-Pecos region, West Texas has become well known as a stronghold for conservative politics. Some of the most heavily Republican counties in the United States are located in the region. Former U.S. President George W. Bush spent most of his childhood in West Texas.

The Panhandle and several counties in the Midland-Odessa area were some of the first parts of Texas to abandon the state's "Solid South" Democratic roots; nine counties have not supported a Democrat for president since 1948. The Rolling Plains to the east remained Democratic for substantially longer: although Walter Mondale's 1984 campaign lost Texas by 27.50%, he won five counties in this region. However, since 2000 this region has swung very rapidly towards the Republican Party due to its population's intransigent opposition to the liberal social policies of the Democratic Party and by 2016, has nearly the same Cook PVI as the Panhandle.

West of the Pecos in popular culture

"West of the Pecos" has become a metaphor for the universe of Westerns. "Fastest draw west of the Pecos" and similar superlatives are a cliche, and the title character of Chisum observed "There’s no law west of Dodge, and no God west of the Pecos”.

See also

 
List of geographical regions in Texas
Llano Estacado
Beach Mountains
Chalk Mountains
Chamizal National Memorial
Davis Mountains
Franklin Mountains State Park
Palo Duro Canyon
Hueco Tanks State Historic Site
Guadalupe Mountains
McKittrick Canyon
Big Bend National Park
Ysleta del Sur Pueblo
Mount Blanco
Wind power in Texas
Farm to Market Road 669
West Texas Intermediate
Wyler Aerial Tramway

References

We Wanna Know: Where Does West Texas Begin?

Notes

External links
 West Texas Vacation Guide - Texas Outside

Regions of Texas